Slide, Kelly, Slide is a 1927 American comedy film, released by Metro-Goldwyn-Mayer, directed by Edward Sedgwick, and starring William Haines, Sally O'Neil, and Harry Carey.

Cast
 William Haines as Jim Kelly (fictionalized version of Mike "King" Kelly)
 Sally O'Neil as Mary Munson
 Harry Carey as Tom Munson
 Frank Coghlan Jr. as Mickey Martin (as Junior Coghlan)
 Warner Richmond as CliffMacklin
 Paul Kelly as Fresbie
 Karl Dane as Swede Hansen
 Guinn 'Big Boy' Williams as McLean (as Guinn Williams)
 Mike Donlin as himself
 Irish Meusel as himself
 Bob Meusel as himself
 Tony Lazzeri as himself
 Johnny Mack Brown as himself
 Lew Fonseca as himself (unconfirmed)

Crew
 David Townsend - Set Designer

See also
 Harry Carey filmography

References

External links

Still at dorothysebastian.com

1927 films
1920s sports comedy films
American sports comedy films
American silent feature films
American black-and-white films
American baseball films
Films directed by Edward Sedgwick
Metro-Goldwyn-Mayer films
1927 comedy films
1920s American films
Silent American comedy films
1920s English-language films
Silent sports comedy films